Renate Müller (26 April 1906 – 7 October 1937) was a German singer and actress in both silent films and sound films, as well as on stage.

One of the most successful actresses in German films from the early 1930s, she was courted by the Nazi Party to appear in films that promoted their ideals, but refused. Her sudden death at the age of 31 was initially attributed to epilepsy, but after the end of World War II, some commentators asserted that she was in fact murdered by Gestapo officers, others that she committed suicide. The true circumstances of her death remain unknown.

Life and career
Born in Munich, Germany, Müller entered films in 1929 in Berlin, and quickly became popular. A blue-eyed blonde, she was considered to be one of the great beauties of her day, and, along with Marlene Dietrich, was seen to embody fashionable Berlin society. She starred in more than twenty German films, including Viktor und Viktoria (1933), one of her biggest successes, which was remade decades later as Victor Victoria with Julie Andrews. After making Sunshine Susie (1932) in England, she returned to Germany and was delayed by anti-German French officials for a short time in Paris. The incident was used by Dennis Wheatley as a basis for his short story, "Espionage". The story and a short discussion of the incident are included in Wheatley's short story collection Mediterranean Nights.

With the rise of the Nazi Party, Müller came to be regarded as an ideal "Aryan" woman, and, particularly in light of Dietrich's move to Hollywood, was courted and promoted as Germany's leading film actress.

Death
When Müller died suddenly, the German press stated the cause as epilepsy. However, it was later revealed that she had died as a result of a fall from a hotel (or hospital) window. According to Channel 4 documentary "Sex and the Swastika", aired in February 2009, she jumped from a Berlin hospital window where she was being treated for a knee injury or drug addiction.

Officially described as a suicide, it was theorised that she took her own life when her relationship with Nazi leaders deteriorated after she showed unwillingness to appear in propaganda films. She was also known to have been pressured to end a relationship with her Jewish lover, but had refused. Near the end of her life, she became addicted to morphine and abused alcohol. Witnesses also recalled seeing several Gestapo officers entering her building shortly before she died. It has been asserted that she was either murdered by Gestapo officers who threw her from a window, or that she panicked when she saw them arrive and jumped. The true circumstances surrounding her death remain unclear.

According to Uwe Klöckner-Draga in his book "Renate Müller – Ihr Leben ein Drahtseilakt", on 3 April, Goebbels wrote in his diary: "Renate tells me her tale of woe. She is a sick woman." On the 6th, he mentioned that she had been interrogated in a very dishonourable way, and on 25 June: "Renate Müller! I help her." At the end of September – according to her sister Gabriele – Renate was drunk and sitting on a window sill when she lost her balance.

Müller's life and death were portrayed in the 1960 film Sweetheart of the Gods.

Filmography

References

 Uwe Klöckner-Draga: Renate Müller, Ihr Leben ein Drahtseilakt – "Ein deutscher Filmstar, der keinen Juden lieben durfte". Kern, 2006,

External links

 
 Virtual History – Bibliography, Photographs and Tobacco cards
 

1906 births
1937 deaths
Musicians from Munich
People from the Kingdom of Bavaria
German film actresses
German silent film actresses
20th-century German actresses
Accidental deaths from falls
Alcohol-related deaths in Germany